Marcelo Birmajer (born November 29, 1966 in Buenos Aires) is an Argentine Jewish author. The grandson of Romanian, Polish, Lithuanian and Syrian immigrants. Best known for writing the script for the 2004 film El abrazo partido. Birmajer's work usually revolves around the Porteño neighbourhood of Once and its colorful inhabitants. Most stories feature Jewish characters, and he frequently uses for them the names Javier, or Mordejai/Mordechai depending on the character's level of religious observance. He also addresses Jewish issues such as synagogue attendance, Bar Mitzvahs, and the ever present alternative to immigrate to Israel.

Other recurrent subjects are married life, especially in his series "Stories of married men", and the Argentine society and its crisis. Many of Birmajer's works have clear autobiographical lines, presenting a main character who is himself a writer. An important part of his bibliography, specially in his beginnings, is youth literature.

Birmajer is a frequent contributor to one or two newspapers throughout the Spanish-speaking world.

His brother, Rabbi Reuven Eduardo Birmajer, was assassinated by Palestinian terrorists in Jerusalem on 23 December 2015. .

Bibliography (Partial)
 Un crimen secundario.
 Derrotado por un muerto.
 El alma al diablo.
 Un veneno saludable.
 Historias de hombres casados.
 No tan distinto.
 Nuevas historias de hombres casados.
 Últimas historias de hombres casados.
 El Once, un recorrido personal.
 Tres mosqueteros.
 El Fuego más alto.
 Hechizos de Amor.
 El Abogado del Marciano

External links
Biography and work (Spanish)

References

1966 births
Living people
Jewish Argentine writers
Argentine Jews
Argentine essayists
Male essayists
Argentine male writers
Argentine male short story writers
Argentine people of Romanian-Jewish descent
Argentine people of Polish-Jewish descent
Argentine people of Lithuanian-Jewish descent
Argentine people of Syrian-Jewish descent
Writers from Buenos Aires